Granados is a municipality in the Mexican state of Sonora, located approximately  northeast of Hermosillo, the state capital. It is named after , the second bishop of Sonora from 1788 to 1794.

Geography
It borders the municipalities of Huásabas to the north, Bacadéhuachi to the east, Divisaderos to the south, and Moctezuma to the west.

Granados lies in the valley of the Bavispe River, which is flanked by the Sierra de Huasabas to the west and the Sierra de Bacadéhuachi to the east. The land cover in Granados mainly comprises subtropical forest (67%), desert grassland (15%) and foothills thornscrub (13%). The northern portion of the Bavispe River valley near the municipal seat of Granados is used for farmland.

Granados has a semi-arid climate.

History
The Opata are the indigenous inhabitants of the Granados valley. The settlement of Granados was founded in 1823 by members of the Durazo family from Moctezuma and their friend Ramón Arvizu. 

On 3 December 1862, the municipality of Granados was established in the district of Moctezuma. It became an independent municipality in 1916. From 31 December 1930 to 16 April 1932 it was merged with the municipality of Cumpas.

Administration
The municipal government of Granados comprises a president, a councillor (Spanish: síndico), and three trustees (regidores) elected by relative majority. The current president of the municipality is José Vinicio Durazo Durazo.

Demographics
In the 2020 Mexican Census, Granados recorded a population of 1009 inhabitants living in 342 households. The 2010 Census recorded a population of 1150 inhabitants in Granados. The municipal seat, also known as Granados, is the only inhabited locality in the municipality.

Economy and infrastructure
In the 2015 Intercensal Survey, 35% of Granados's workforce was employed in the primary sector, 15% in the secondary sector, 13% in commerce, and 34% in services. Cattle farming is the main economic activity.

A paved road runs from Granados north to Huásabas, where it intersects with the highway to Moctezuma and Hermosillo. There is also an airstrip in Granados.

References

Municipalities of Sonora
1862 establishments in Mexico
1930 disestablishments in Mexico
1932 establishments in Mexico
States and territories established in 1862
States and territories disestablished in 1930
States and territories established in 1932